Robert Wilde (13 September 1900 – 1939) was an English professional footballer who played as a wing half. He made almost 100 appearances in the Football League between 1919 and 1924.

References

1900 births
1939 deaths
Sportspeople from Shipley, West Yorkshire
English footballers
Association football wing halves
Bradford City A.F.C. players
Nelson F.C. players
Halifax Town A.F.C. players
English Football League players